Harold J. "Jack" Peterman (July 31, 1942 – August 10, 2016) was an American politician. He was a Republican member of the Delaware House of Representatives, representing District 33 from 2011 until his death in 2016. Peterman was born in Milford and became a farmer after graduating from high school. He died after a period of declining health at the age of 74.

Electoral history
In 2006, Peterman ran to replace retiring Republican G. Wallace Caulk Jr., but lost in the Republican primary by 25 votes with 471 votes total (48.7%) against Ulysses S. Grant. Democratic nominee Robert E. Walls went on to win the general election against Grant.
In 2008, Peterman was unopposed for the Republican nomination but lost the general election with 4,790 votes (46.3%) to newly elected Democrat Robert E. Walls.
In 2010, Peterman won the Republican primary with 1,102 votes (56.3%) against Steven Rust. Peterman again faced Democrat Robert E. Walls in the general election and now won with 4,313 votes (52.2%) against Walls.
In 2012, Peterman was unopposed for the Republican nomination and won the general election with 4,825 votes (53.4%) against Democratic nominee John Kevin Robbins.
In 2014, Peterman won the Republican primary with 657 votes (64.5%) against Charles Postles Jr. He went on to win the general election with 3,336 votes (57.9%) in a rematch against Democratic nominee John Kevin Robbins.

References

1942 births
2016 deaths
People from Milford, Delaware
Farmers from Delaware
Republican Party members of the Delaware House of Representatives